Island Station Power Plant was a coal power plant on the Mississippi River less than a mile up-river from downtown Saint Paul, Minnesota. St. Paul Gas & Light Company commissioned construction of the plant in 1921. In 1923, before construction was even complete, a more efficient technology for burning coal was developed, rendering the plant obsolete before it even opened.

The plant came online in 1926 and operated at three-fourths the intended capacity until 1943 when it was shifted to an off-peak use and only produced power 6–10 weeks per year. In 1975, Northern States Power Co. (who acquired the plant shortly after it was finished) decommissioned the plant and used it for storage.

In 1985 John Kerwin bought the plant and converted portions of the building into studio apartments for local artists. For a time a colony of a half-dozen to a dozen houseboat dwellers moored at the plant. In 2003 Island Station L.L.C. purchased the property for $1.5 million with the hope of turning it into a 235-unit condo with a 20-slip marina. After the $80 million project started work and more than 100 units had been reserved, the project stalled. In 2013, the property was sold for $4.05 million to St Paul Riverwalk, LLC of Scottsdale, Arizona.  In February, 2014, a permit was authorized to demolish the plant. The entire structure was imploded on March 16, 2014, at 9:58 am.

Tour the plant 
 Set of exterior photos taken with permission and available on Flickr.

References 
 , accessed March 14, 2014
 , accessed March 14, 2014
 Island Station Riverfront Condos web site, accessed July 27, 2007
 "Powerful players back power-plant condos" Minneapolis / St. Paul Business Journal - September 3, 2004 - by Sam Black - accessed July 27, 2007
 "Castaways" City Pages - March 17, 2004 - by Mike Mosedale - accessed July 28, 2007
 Island Station For Sale, accessed June 21, 2011

1926 establishments in Minnesota
1975 disestablishments in Minnesota
Energy infrastructure completed in 1926
Buildings and structures demolished in 2014
Buildings and structures demolished by controlled implosion
History of Minnesota
Buildings and structures in Saint Paul, Minnesota
Coal-fired power stations in Minnesota
Former coal-fired power stations in the United States
Demolished buildings and structures in Minnesota
Former power stations in Minnesota